Sierra Leone competed at the 2020 Summer Olympics in Tokyo. Originally scheduled to take place from 24 July to 9 August 2020, the Games were postponed to 23 July to 8 August 2021, due to the COVID-19 pandemic. It was the nation's twelfth appearance at the Summer Olympics having appeared at all but two Games since its debut in 1968; Sierra Leone failed to register any athletes at the 1972 Summer Olympics in Munich, and also joined the rest of the African nations to boycott the 1976 Summer Olympics in Montreal.

Competitors
The following is the list of number of competitors in the Games.

Athletics

Sierra Leone received a universality slot from the World Athletics to send a female track and field athlete to the Olympics.

Track & road events

Judo

Sierra Leone received an invitation from the Tripartite Commission and the International Judo Federation to send Frederick Harris in the men's half-middleweight category (81 kg) to the Olympics, marking the nation's debut in the sport. However, Harris was disqualified after being overweight.

Swimming

Sierra Leone received a universality invitation from FINA to send two top-ranked swimmers (one per gender) in their respective individual events to the Olympics, based on the FINA Points System of June 28, 2021.

References

Olympics
2020
Nations at the 2020 Summer Olympics